Meir Teomi (15 July 1898 – 10 August 1947) was a Ukrainian-born actor and immigrant to Mandatory Palestine in 1919 who was murdered during a terrorist attack in 1947. He was the father of Israeli actor .

Death 
Teomi was performing on stage in the Hawaii Garden restaurant of Tel Avivon August 10, 1947. An Arab gang from Al-Shaykh Muwannis stormed the cafe and shot five people dead, including Teomi. Time Magazine reported that it may have been "the first serious attack by Arabs on Jews since 1939". The Arab Falastin newspaper incorrectly reported that the attack had been done by Yemenite Jews against Arabs, leading to a wave of Palestinian attacks against Yemenites. The Haganah also carried out reprisals against Arab targets it believed were responsible for the attack.

Films and plays 

 Sabra, 1933
 This Is the Land, 1935

References

External links 

 

1898 births
1947 deaths
Actors from Mykolaiv
Ukrainian emigrants to Mandatory Palestine
Jewish Ukrainian actors
20th-century Ukrainian male actors
Jewish male actors
1947 murders in Asia
1947 in Mandatory Palestine
Deaths by firearm in Mandatory Palestine
People murdered in Mandatory Palestine
Ukrainian terrorism victims